The Battle of San Carlos was a battle between aircraft and ships that lasted from 21 to 25 May 1982 during the British landings on the shores of San Carlos Water (which became known as "Bomb Alley") in the 1982 Falklands War. Low-flying land-based Argentine jet aircraft made repeated attacks on ships of the British Task Force.

It was the first time in history that a modern surface fleet armed with surface-to-air missiles and with air cover from carrier-based aircraft defended against full-scale air strikes. The British sustained losses and damage but were able to create and consolidate a beachhead and land troops.

Background
After the Argentine invasion of the Falkland Islands the United Kingdom initiated Operation Corporate, sending a Task Force 12000 km south in order to retake the islands. Under the codename Operation Sutton the British forces planned amphibious landings around San Carlos, on an inlet located off Falkland Sound, the strait between East Falkland and West Falkland. The location was chosen as the landing force would be protected by the terrain against Exocet and submarine attacks, and it was distant enough from Stanley to prevent a rapid reaction from Argentine ground troops stationed there.

The landing took the Argentines completely by surprise; Argentine Navy officers had considered that the location was not a good choice for such an operation, and had left the zone without major defences.

Argentine forces

With Argentine army forces generally confined to a static defensive role, and the Navy's surface fleet remaining in port after the sinking of the ARA General Belgrano, the task of opposing the landings fell mostly on the pilots of Argentine Air Force (FAA) and the Argentine Naval Aviation (COAN). They were operating under severe limitations due to the distance to the target area and limited refuelling resources.

The  A-4 Skyhawk was the main attack aircraft of both the Air Force and the Navy, having been acquired from US Navy surplus stocks in the late 1960s and early 1970s. At the beginning of the war, the FAA had 36 A-4Bs and 16 A-4Cs listed as active, though not all were necessarily operational. In late April, Grupo 5 de Caza deployed two temporary squadrons with 11 A-4Bs each to Rio Gallegos while Grupo 4 activated one squadron with nine A-4Cs at San Julián. Following the sinking of the Belgrano, the Navy's carrier-borne force of 8 A-4Qs was based at Río Grande naval airbase where they were joined by two refurbished aircraft of the same type. In spite of using two 295-gallons drop tanks each, the Skyhawks needed two aerial refuelings during missions. Bomb loads used during the conflict consisted of one British-made 1000 lb (Mk 17) unguided bomb or four 227 kg Mk 82 Snake Eye tail retarded bombs. The aircraft were armed with two 20 mm Colt Mk 12 cannon, although these were notoriously unreliable.

The Israeli-built copy of the Mirage 5 known as the Dagger was the Argentine Air Force's newest aircraft. Thirty-six were available to Grupo 6 in April 1982, with a serviceability rate of 60 to 70 percent. On April 25, one squadron with 9 aircraft was deployed to San Julian, while another was activated at Río Grande with 10. They did not have aerial refuelling capacity and, using twin 550-gallon drop tanks, were flying at the limit of their range. A typical Dagger load during the conflict would include one 1000 lb Mk 17 bomb and two 1500 litre drop tanks. They retained their 30 mm DEFA cannon.

Fighter cover would be provided by Grupo 8's Mirage IIIEAs based at Rio Gallegos but the French-built interceptor had an internal fuel tank even smaller than that of the Dagger, and they could not fly low enough (which used more fuel) to escort the strike aircraft. Even by flying at high altitude, the Mirages could not fly for more than a few minutes over the islands.

The FAA units deployed to southern Argentina during the war were regrouped under a command known as Fuerza Aerea Sur, or FAS, led by Brigadier-General Ernesto Crespo. Anti-ship training was carried out against Argentine Type 42 destroyers similar to those used by the British.

On the islands themselves, the lack of long hard runways precluded the use of high-performance jets. Instead less capable aircraft were employed. The Argentine-built FMA IA-58 Pucara, which could operate from grass airstrips such as the one at Goose Green where six were based at the time of the British landings. The aircraft was ruggedly-built and armed with two 20 mm cannons, four 7.62 mm machine guns, and rocket pods, but as a propeller-driven counter-insurgency aircraft, it was not designed to take on well-defended targets. At Port Stanley Airport, the Argentine Navy's 1 Escuadrilla de Ataque operated five Aermacchi MB-339 trainers in the light attack role, armed with 30 mm gun pods and Zuni rockets.

Near Stanley the Argentinians deployed a long-range Westinghouse AN/TPS-43 radar that proved capable of detecting British aircraft at distances up to 40 miles.

British amphibious force

British air cover was provided by aircraft carrier, deploying short-takeoff, vertical-landing Harriers.

 Air cover: aircraft carrier HMS Hermes (R12)
(800 Squadron (BAE Sea Harrier, 809 Squadron (BAE Sea Harrier)), HMS Invincible (R05) (801 Squadron (BAE Sea Harrier), 809 Squadron (BAE Sea Harrier))
 Landing force: HMS Fearless, HMS Intrepid, RFA Sir Geraint, RFA Sir Tristram, RFA Sir Galahad, RFA Sir Percivale, RFA Sir Lancelot, SS Canberra, RFA Fort Austin, Europic Ferry 'M/V Norland
and Elk 5.
 Escort force: HMS Antrim, HMS Coventry, HMS Broadsword, HMS Brilliant, HMS Ardent, HMS Antelope, HMS Plymouth and HMS Yarmouth

Engagements

This is a list of the main sorties carried out by Argentine air units showing approximate local time, Aircraft and Call signal.

21 May

The Argentine Army force on site was a section from the 25th Infantry Regiment named Combat Team Güemes. The 62-man unit, under 1st Lieutenant Carlos Esteban, was dispatched to the area on May 15 following HMS Alacrity's passage through Falkland Sound. An outpost with two 81mm mortars and two recoilless 105mm rifles was established on Fanning Head, in order to watch for amphibious landings and control the entrance to the Sound. On the night of the British landings, 19 men under 2nd Lieutenant Roberto Reyes were manning the outpost, while Esteban and the remainder of the unit were stationed in Port San Carlos settlement.

The British fleet entered San Carlos during the night and at 02:50 was spotted by EC Güemes which opened fire with 81mm mortars and two recoilless 105mm rifles. They were soon engaged by British naval gunfire and a 25-man SBS team; forced to retreat, they lost their communications equipment; but they shot down two Gazelle helicopters with small-arms fire, killing three members of the two aircrews.  The first Gazelle's pilot, Sergeant Andrew Evans, was hit and fatally injured, but he managed to crash-land the aircraft into the sea. Evans and the other crewman, Sergeant Edward Candlish, were thrown out of the aircraft, and Argentine troops shot at them for about 15 minutes as they struggled in the water, ignoring orders from their commanding officer to cease fire. When the firing stopped, Candlish managed to drag Evans to shore, where he died. Minutes later, a second British Gazelle helicopter, following the same route as the first, was raked by machine-gun fire from the Argentine platoon and shot down, killing the crew, Lt. Ken Francis and L/Cpl. Pat Giffin.

1st Lt Carlos Daniel Esteban from EC Güemes informed Goose Green garrison about the landings at 08:22 (he was finally evacuated by helicopter on 26 May).  The Argentine high command at Stanley initially thought that a landing operation was not feasible at San Carlos and the operation was a diversion. At 10:00, a COAN Aermacchi MB-339 jet based on the islands was dispatched to San Carlos on a reconnaissance flight. In the meantime, the FAA had already started launching their mainland-based aircraft at 09:00.

Between 10:15 and 17:12, seventeen sorties were carried out by FAA and COAN. Daggers and A-4Cs of the FAA made attacks on HMS Antrim, HMS Argonaut, HMS Broadsword, HMS Brilliant, and HMS Ardent. Sorties of MIIIEA aircraft were used as diversions as well. While many of the bombs did not explode, Ardent and Argonaut were hit, sustaining damage and casualties. Sea Harriers intercepted some of the attackers, destroying 8 FAA aircraft.

22 May
HMS Ardent, badly damaged on 21 May, eventually sank early in the morning. Bad weather over the Patagonia airfields prevented the Argentines from carrying out most of their air missions; only a few Skyhawks managed to reach the islands. The British completed their surface-to-air Rapier battery launcher deployments.

23 May
On 23 May Argentine aircraft resumed attacking, striking HMS Antelope, HMS Broadsword, and HMS Yarmouth. Only Antelope was damaged, sinking before dawn on 24 May, after an unexploded bomb detonated while being defused. Of the attacking aircraft, two were shot down. An additional COAN pilot was killed after ejecting from his A-4Q after a tyre burst upon landing.

24 May

On 24 May the Argentine pilots on the continent openly expressed their concern about the lack of collaboration between the three branches of the armed forces, and protested with passive resistance. General Galtieri, acting president of Argentina, decided to visit Comodoro Rivadavia the next day, 25 May (Argentina's National Day), to try to convince them to keep fighting, but when he arrived in the morning the pilots had changed their minds and were already flying to the islands.

Six sorties were launched by the FAA against the British forces. RFA Sir Lancelot and probably Sir Galahad and Sir Bedivere and ground targets were attacked. Four attack aircraft were shot down, with one pilot killed.

25 May
Attacks by the FAA on 25 May proved more successful than the previous day. HMS Coventry was sunk after being hit with  bombs. Attacks on HMS Broadsword damaged the frigate's communication systems and hydraulics and shattered the nose of her Sea Lynx helicopter. RFA Sir Lancelot was also attacked. One sortie accidentally attacked Goose Green, mistaking it for Ajax Bay, and was hit by small arms friendly fire. Three attackers were shot down, one by the combined San Carlos air defences; claims include HMS Yarmouth's Seacat, Rapier, Blowpipe and ship-based gunfire, with two more shot down by Sea Darts fired by HMS Coventry.

Aftermath

In spite of the British air defence network, the Argentine pilots were able to attack their targets but some serious procedural failures prevented them from getting better results – most notably, shortcomings of their bomb fuses.  Thirteen bombs hit British ships without detonating.  Lord Craig, the retired Marshal of the Royal Air Force, is said to have remarked: "Six better  and we would have lost".

The British warships, although themselves suffering most of the attacks, were successful in keeping the strike aircraft away from the landing ships, which were well inside the bay. With the British troops on Falklands soil, a land campaign followed until Argentine General Mario Menéndez surrendered to British Major General Jeremy Moore on 15 June in Stanley.

The subsonic Harrier jump-jet, armed with the AIM-9L Sidewinder air-to-air missile, proved capable as an air superiority fighter.

The actions had a profound impact on later naval practice.  During the 1980s most warships from navies around the world were retrofitted with close-in weapon systems and guns for self-defence. First reports of the number of Argentine aircraft shot down by British missile systems were subsequently revised down.

See also
 Argentine air forces in the Falklands War
 British naval forces in the Falklands War

References

References
  Commodore Ruben Oscar Moro:  La Guerra Inaudita, 
  Commodore Pablo Marcos Carballo: Dios Y Los Halcones,

External links
 Interview Video on HMS Ardent attack
 Bomb Alley video – Lt Tomas Lucero rescued by HMS Fearless
 Painting of Lt Owen Crippa solo attack on the frigate "Argonaut"

Battles of the Falklands War
Argentine Air Force
Argentine Naval Aviation
Aerial operations and battles of the Falklands War
Naval aviation operations and battles
British Army in the Falklands War
May 1982 events in South America
Naval battles post-1945